ACLS may refer to:

 Acrocallosal syndrome, a genetic disease
 Advanced cardiac life support, a set of clinical interventions for medical emergencies
 American Council of Learned Societies, a federation of scholarly organizations
 Axcelis Technologies, a company producing equipment for the semiconductor manufacturing industry
 Automatic Carrier Landing System
 Association of Canada Lands Surveyors, the licensing body for professional surveyors practicing on federal lands in Canada

See also 

 ACL (disambiguation)
 CLS (disambiguation)
 CL (disambiguation)